The Shadow ministry of Lawrence Springborg is the Liberal National Party opposition between February 2015 and May 2016, opposing the Palaszczuk government in the Parliament of Queensland. It was led by Lawrence Springborg following his election as leader of the party and Opposition Leader on 14 February 2015. John-Paul Langbroek was the deputy party leader and Deputy Leader of the Opposition. Their elections came after the shock loss of Government for the LNP in which the Premier Campbell Newman also lost his seat of Ashgrove to Labor's Kate Jones.

The current Shadow Ministry was announced on 20 February 2015. It succeeded the Palaszczuk shadow ministry and was replaced by the Nicholls shadow ministry 6 May 2016.

See also

2015 Queensland state election
First Palaszczuk Ministry

References

Springborg